Noé Marcano Rivera is a Puerto Rican politician and the current mayor of Naguabo. Rivera is affiliated with the New Progressive Party (PNP) and has served as mayor since 2013. Rivera has a master's degree from the Interamerican University of Puerto Rico. In 2020 New Progressive Party chair Pedro Pierluisi appointed Noe Marcano as Secretary General of the New Progressive Party.

References

Living people
Interamerican University of Puerto Rico alumni
Mayors of places in Puerto Rico
New Progressive Party (Puerto Rico) politicians
People from Naguabo, Puerto Rico
1980 births